Heal's ("Heal and Son Ltd") is a British furniture retail company comprising seven stores, selling a range of furniture, lighting and home accessories. For over two centuries, it has been known for promoting modern design and employing talented young designers.

History
The original Heal's firm was established in 1810 as a feather-dressing business by John Harris Heal and his son.

In 1818, the business moved to Tottenham Court Road, London and expanded into bedding, bedstead and furniture manufacture and into retailing. By the end of the nineteenth century it was one of the best-known furniture suppliers in London.

In the early 20th century Heal's was one of the first retailers to bring electric lighting to the British market. During the second world war the factory at Tottenham Court Road was converted to produce parachutes. Heal's featured at the Festival of Britain in 1951 and in 1977 restored the banqueting table at Buckingham Palace for the Queen's Silver Jubilee.

Ambrose Heal

The notability of Heal's rests upon the achievements of Sir Ambrose Heal, who worked in the company as craftsman, designer and finally Chairman, for 60 years from 1893 to 1953.

Ambrose Heal's contribution to the business, and to British furniture-making and applied design, was his marriage of the ethos of the Arts and Crafts Movement as to beauty and utility with the techniques and economics of commerce. The combination of 'Good Design' with industrial production was contrary to the moral, hand crafted principles of the Arts and Crafts Movement but was in line with the certain European approaches to bringing high calibre product design to a middle class market.

Following the precedent of the Deutscher Werkbund, which had been established in Germany in 1907, Ambrose Heal was one of the group of designers, industrialists and business people who founded the Design and Industries Association in 1915, slogan "Nothing Need Be Ugly".

Heal developed his business as a design, manufacturing and retail concern in accord with the philosophy of which he was a key proponent.

Heal's at Tottenham Court Road
Heal's has operated since 1818 in Tottenham Court Road, and from the present site since 1840. Its first purpose-built store, completed in 1854, was then one of the largest in London: the architect was James Lockyer who presented the RIBA with a photographic elevation in May 1855. This is one of the earliest known professional applications of architectural photography in Britain.

The central part of the present building was commissioned by Ambrose Heal and designed by his cousin, and best friend, Cecil Brewer of the architectural practice Smith and Brewer. It was completed in 1917 and is a distinctive modern building, immediately hailed as a landmark in shop architecture, subsequently extended in a number of phases. The Brewer improvements included a spiral staircase that is still part of the store to this day, providing access across all three retail floors.

A bronze cat presides over the staircase that is considered to be the store mascot. It was once sold to a customer by Dodie Smith (author of 101 Dalmatians) who was then a Heal's sales assistant, but Heal wrote to the customer retracting the sale with a card saying "Heal's mascot. Not for sale". An extension on the southern side of the building was added in 1938, designed by Sir Edward Maufe.

Mansard Gallery
The new Tottenham Court Road store included an art gallery, the Mansard Gallery, which held several influential exhibitions. It was a significant venue in the artistic life of London between the wars; it was where Aldous Huxley first met Virginia Woolf, and where sets of furniture were presented to Mies van der Rohe, Marcel Breuer and Maxwell Fry.

Exhibition of French Art 1914-1919
The most influential exhibition held at the Mansard Gallery was the Exhibition of French Art 1914-1919, held in 1919. This was organised by the art critic Sacheverell Sitwell, included works by several now-famous artists and was the first British exhibition of Picasso, Matisse and Modigliani.

The exhibition was well received by modernist critics and received generally positive reviews in The Times and The Manchester Guardian.

The Mansard Gallery closed in the 1980s. In 2010 an online version of the Mansard Gallery opened on Heal's website.

Guildford store
A second store was opened in Guildford in 1972 and the company remained highly profitable until the mid-1970s, when it began to suffer losses, principally in the non-retail businesses. In May 2015, Heal's announced the Guildford store would close prior to the redevelopment of the Tunsgate shopping centre.

Corporate history
Heal's was run as a family business designing, manufacturing and selling furniture, applied arts, interior decorating and household goods until 1983. The business has subsequently been in a number of ownerships trading as a retailer.

Acquisition by Storehouse
Until its acquisition by Storehouse plc in 1983, the business operated as a number of separate companies carrying out particular trading activities. These included retailing, contracting, fabric conversion and wholesaling, cabinet furniture manufacture and bed and bedding manufacture. The various operating companies were owned by an investment company, Heal & Son (Holdings) Ltd. After the acquisition, a number of trading activities were reduced and the Company operated only as a retailer.

Management buyout
In 1984 Heal's was expanded to five stores from the original two. In the recession of the late 1980s the business again incurred losses and after shrinking back to the two original stores the company was the subject of a management buyout.

The buyout became effective in September 1990 ending a seven-year period in the Storehouse group of companies. Whilst part of Storehouse, Heal's had been one of a national portfolio of retailers. Following the management buyout the business merchandise range was expanded with most of the product lines changed to ranges designed especially for Heal's.

In the second half of the nineties Heal's started to expand and develop, opening a new store on King's Road Chelsea in 1995 and floating the company on the London Stock Exchange in 1997. In 1998 a new store was opened in Kingston, London and then in November 2000 Heal's launched an ecommerce website. The company has stated its intention to become an ‘ecommerce business with showrooms'.

Acquisition by Wittington Investments
On 16 August 2001, Wittington Investments Limited acquired Heal's plc, reverting it to a private company. The new owner has stated that it supports Heal's "unique character", intending it to continue as a contemporary home furnishing retailer.

Recent history
Following the Wittington acquisition, Heal's expanded nationally and developed online retailing. New outlets outside the South East of England included stores in the centre of Manchester opened in 2003, although this store closed in 2010, at Redbrick Mill in Batley, near Leeds in 2005 and Brighton in 2007. The Brighton store subsequently closed in 2022.

In 2015 the Kings Road store in London was replaced by a smaller store in Notting Hill, which in 2018 re-opened in the Westfield London shopping centre.

In 2017 a store was opened in the Mailbox Birmingham shopping centre. In 2019 an outlet store was opened in Chiswick, London.

The flagship Tottenham Court Road store celebrated its 200th year in 2018, marking the anniversary by re-erecting the iconic 'Sign of the Four Poster'. Reinterpreted by sign-writer Hannah Sunny Whaler, the sign and hanging arm were recreated using images from the company's archive.

References

External links 

 

 
Department store buildings in the United Kingdom
Department stores of the United Kingdom
Companies based in the London Borough of Camden
Shops in London
Tottenham Court Road